BTC City Ljubljana was a professional cycling team based in Slovenia, which competed in elite road bicycle racing events such as the UCI Women's World Tour between 2010 and 2019.

Team history
At the end of the team's first season at UCI level in 2014 the Slovenian Cycling Federation awarded the team a prize for their role in the development of cycling in Slovenia, as well as, for the team's achievements in its first year – culminating in qualifying for the 2014 World Team Time Trial championships.

Final team roster

Major wins
2014
Nagrada Ljubljane TT, Martina Ritter
2015
Stage 2 Internationale Thüringen Rundfahrt der Frauen, Eugenia Bujak
2016
 Overall Gracia–Orlová, Olena Pavlukhina
Stage 2, Olena Pavlukhina
Stages 1 & 6  Route de France, Eugenia Bujak
GP Plouay, Eugenia Bujak
2017
 Sprints classification Thüringen Rundfahrt der Frauen, Eugenia Bujak
 Mountains classification Tour Cycliste Féminin International de l'Ardèche, Hanna Nilsson
2018
 Youth classification Tour of Chongming Island, Anastasiia Iakovenko
Leo Wirth Gedächtnissrennen, Corinna Lechner
Radfestival Kladow 1, Corinna Lechner
Radfestival Kladow 2, Corinna Lechner
2019
Team classification Vuelta a Burgos Feminas
Erondegemse Pijl (Erpe-Mere), Monique van de Ree

National and Continental Champions

2010
 Slovenia Time Trial, Tjasa Rutar
2011
 Slovenia Time Trial, Tjasa Rutar
2012
 Slovenia Time Trial, Tjasa Rutar
2013
 Slovenia Time Trial, Sara Frece
2014
 European Track (Points race), Eugenia Bujak
 Austrian Time Trial, Martina Ritter
 Croatian Cyclo-cross, Mia Radotić
 Poland Time Trial, Eugenia Bujak
 Slovenian Road Race, Polona Batagelj
 Slovenian Time Trial, Polona Batagelj
2015
 Austrian Time Trial, Martina Ritter
 Austrian Road Race, Martina Ritter
 Azerbaijan Road Race, Olena Pavlukhina
 Azerbaijan Time Trial, Olena Pavlukhina
 Croatia Road Race, Mia Radotić
 Croatia Time Trial, Mia Radotić
 Poland Time Trial, Eugenia Bujak
 Slovenia Time Trila, Polona Batagelj
 Slovenia Road Race, Polona Batagelj
2016
 Azerbaijan Road Race, Olena Pavlukhina
 Azerbaijan Time Trial, Olena Pavlukhina
 Slovenia Time Trial, Urša Pintar
 Croatia Road Race, Mia Radotić
 Croatia Time Trial, Mia Radotić
 Austrian Time Trial, Martina Ritter
 Serbia Time Trial, Jelena Erić
 Serbia Road Race, Jelena Erić
 Slovenia Road Race, Polona Batagelj
2017
 Slovenia Time Trial, Urša Pintar
 Croatian Time Trial, Mia Radotić
 Serbia Time Trial, Jelena Erić
 Croatian Road Race, Mia Radotić
 Slovenia Road Race, Polona Batagelj
2018
 Slovenia Time Trial, Eugenia Bujak
 Croatian Time Trial, Mia Radotić
 Slovenia Road Race, Polona Batagelj
 Croatian Road Race, Mia Radotić
 Azerbaijan Road Race, Olena Pavlukhina
 Azerbaijan Time Trial, Olena Pavlukhina
 Russia Track (Team pursuit), Anastasiia Iakovenko
2019
 Slovenia Time Trial, Eugenia Bujak
 Croatian Time Trial, Mia Radotić
 Slovenia Road Race, Eugenia Bujak

References

External links

Cycling teams based in Slovenia
UCI Women's Teams
Cycling teams established in 2014
2014 establishments in Slovenia
Cycling teams disestablished in 2019
2019 disestablishments in Slovenia